The Unionist Party, later known as the Unconditional Union Party in the border states, was a political party in the United States started after the Compromise of 1850 to define politicians who supported the Compromise. It was used primarily as a label by politicians who did not want to affiliate with the Republicans, or wished to win over anti-secession Democrats. Members included Southern Democrats who were loyal to the Union as well as elements of the old Whig Party and other factions opposed to a separate Southern Confederacy.

Following the beginning of the Civil War, state conventions would even endorse fusion tickets of Republicans and War Democrats under the Unionist banner, which the national party itself would do in the 1864 presidential election in the form of the National Union Party.

History

Origins
The label first appeared in 1850, during the dispute over the Compromise of 1850. Southerners who supported the Compromise (mainly Whigs) adopted the Unionist label to win over pro-Compromise Democrats and defeat anti-Compromise Democrats. The name change emphasized the Compromise issue and implied that ordinary Whig political issues, such as the tariff, had been set aside.

By 1860, the Whig Party was defunct. A group of former Whigs formed the Constitutional Union Party, with John Bell as candidate for president. Also as in 1850, ex-Whigs and anti-secession Democrats combined as "Unionists" to oppose secessionists in state elections, especially in Kentucky, Maryland, Missouri and Virginia, where the Republican Party label was still toxic. Bell's candidacy was ineffective, but the state strategy proved successful as the American Civil War began in 1861.

During the Civil War
Following the splintered 1860 presidential election, it became apparent that much of the South would not abide by the election of Abraham Lincoln. In Missouri, Francis P. Blair, Jr. began consolidating that state's supporters of Lincoln, John Bell, and Stephen A. Douglas into a new political party, the Unconditional Union Party, which would lay aside antebellum partisan interests in favor of a single cause, the preservation of the Union. Blair and his supporters' primary goal was "to resist the intrigues of the Secessionists, by political action preferably, by force if need were".

Another faction in Missouri also supported restoration of the Union, but with conditions and reservations, including granting the extension of slavery westward. Others believed that once the Southern states should be allowed to leave the Union peaceably as they would soon realize their mistake and petition for restoration to the Union. Blair worked to form an alliance with these so-called "Conditional Unionists" to bolster his numbers.

The first formal convention of the Missouri Unconditional Union Party was held on February 28, 1861 in St. Louis, Missouri. No avowed secessionists were invited: only those political leaders who had openly supported Bell, Lincoln or Douglas were allowed to participate. The delegates passed a series of resolutions including formally declaring "at present there is no adequate cause to impel Missouri to dissolve her connection with the Federal Union", a move that swiftly was repudiated by the pro-secession faction as having no constitutional validity. As a compromise to the Conditional Unionists, the convention also entreated "the Federal government as the seceding States to withhold and stay the arm of military power, and on no pretense whatever bring upon the nation the horrors of civil war".

Missouri's secessionists failed to garner enough statewide support to dissolve the Union, so under the leadership of Governor Claiborne F. Jackson they broke away and formed a separatist government and eventually took up arms against the Union Army. Pro-Union politicians consolidated their control over Missouri politics as the war progressed and Jackson and his pro-Confederacy Missouri State Guard were forced out of the state. Unconditional Unionist Benjamin Franklin Loan was elected to the 38th United States Congress.

Union or Unionist parties existed in other Northern states as well. In the 1862 Connecticut gubernatorial election, a fusion ticket of Republicans and War Democrats was nominated by the "Union Party of Connecticut" for all state offices.

Diffusion and decline
A similar movement was underway in Maryland, where its leaders also advocated the immediate emancipation of all slaves in the state without compensation to the slave owners. With the help of the federal government and its troops, Maryland's secessionist voices were stilled. The party was not formalized until summer 1863 when adherents worked to elect pro-Union candidates at the state and local level, particularly in Western Maryland. Because Lincoln's Emancipation Proclamation only applied to slaves in those states in rebellion and did not include border states such as Maryland, the party shifted its emphasis to the question of freeing slaves locally. The Conservative Union State Central Committee, led by Thomas Swann and John P. Kennedy, met in Baltimore on December 16, 1863. It passed a resolution supporting immediate emancipation "in the manner easiest for master and slave". Supporters included the local military commander, Robert C. Schenck. When the Federal government failed to respond, the Unconditional Union policy held a second similar meeting on April 6, 1864 and again overwhelmingly supported immediate emancipation. General Schenk's replacement, Lew Wallace, supported the resolution.

Lists of Unionists
The lists below are of Senators and Representatives elected as Unionist during the Civil War.
 Union Party Senators:
 Lemuel J. Bowden
 Benjamin Gratz Brown
 John Snyder Carlile
 John Creswell
 Garrett Davis
 John Brooks Henderson
 Thomas Holliday Hicks
 Reverdy Johnson
 Waitman Thomas Willey
 Robert Wilson
 Peter G. Van Winkle
 Joseph Albert Wright
 Union Party Representatives:
 Lucien Anderson
 Jacob B. Blair
 Henry Taylor Blow
 Sempronius H. Boyd
 George Washington Bridges
 William Gay Brown, Sr.
 George H. Browne
 Charles Benedict Calvert
 Samuel L. Casey
 Brutus J. Clay
 Andrew Jackson Clements
 John Woodland Crisfield
 John Jordan Crittenden
 Henry W. Davis
 Thomas Treadwell Davis
 Ebenezer Dumont
 George W. Dunlap
 George Purnell Fisher
 Benjamin Franklin Flanders
 Henry Grider
 Michael Hahn
 William Augustus Hall
 Aaron Harding
 Richard Almgill Harrison
 Chester D. Hubbard
 James Streshly Jackson
 Austin Augustus King
 Samuel Knox
 George Robert Latham
 Cornelius Lawrence Ludlow Leary
 Benjamin F. Loan
 Robert Mallory
 Henry May
 Horace Maynard
 Joseph W. McClurg
 Samuel McKee
 Lewis McKenzie
 John William Menzies
 Thomas Amos Rogers Nelson
 John William Noell
 Charles E. Phelps
 William H. Randall
 James S. Rollins
 Lovell Rousseau
 Joseph Segar
 Green Clay Smith
 Nathaniel B. Smithers
 Benjamin Franklin Thomas
 Francis Thomas
 Charles Horace Upton
 William H. Wadsworth
 Edwin Hanson Webster
 Kellian Van Rensalear Whaley
 George Helm Yeaman

Electoral history

Presidential elections

Congressional elections

See also
 Anthony Kennedy, a Senator from Maryland
 Southern Unionist

References

Notes
 Silbey, Joel H., A Respectable Minority: The Democratic Party in the Civil War Era, 1860–1868. New York: W.W. Norton, (1977).
 Harding, Samuel B., Life of George R. Smith, Founder of Sedalia, Mo. Sedalia, Missouri: Privately printed, 1904.
 Small, Albion W., "The Beginnings of American Nationality." Johns Hopkins University Studies in Historical and Political Science, Eighth Series. Baltimore: Johns Hopkins Press, 1890. 
 Willoughby, William F., "State Activities in Relation to Labor in the United States," Johns Hopkins University Studies in Historical and Political Science, Vol. XIX. Baltimore: Johns Hopkins Press, 1901.

External links

 
Political parties in the United States
Unionism